União, Piauí is a municipality in the state of Piauí in the Northeast region of Brazil. As of 2010, União had a population of 44,569.

See also
List of municipalities in Piauí

References

Municipalities in Piauí